Impulsora del Deportivo Necaxa S.A. de C.V. Premier played in the Liga Premier in Aguascalientes City, Aguascalientes, Mexico and were the official reserve team for Club Necaxa. The games were held in the city of Aguascalientes City in the Casa Club Necaxa.

Players

Current squad

References

Football clubs in Aguascalientes
Mexican reserve football clubs
Liga Premier de México